Garden Village is an unincorporated community in Pike County, Kentucky.

History
It was founded as Liberty upon the creation of the county in 1822, with the intention of the community becoming the seat of local governance. The site proved unpopular with local residents and Liberty was replaced by Pike (present-day Pikeville) the next year. Garden Village was established on the site by local landowner William Justice in 1945 and named after Garden City, New York, which he had once visited. It does not have a separate post office.

See also
 Other places named Garden Village

References

Populated places established in 1822
Unincorporated communities in Pike County, Kentucky
Unincorporated communities in Kentucky
1822 establishments in Kentucky